William Cotter may refer to:

William Richard Cotter (1882–1916), English soldier and recipient of the Victoria Cross
William R. Cotter (politician) (1926–1981), Democratic Party member of the United States House of Representatives from Connecticut
William R. Cotter (college president), lawyer and President of Colby College
William Cotter (bishop) (1866–1940), Irish-born Roman Catholic bishop of Portsmouth, England
Bill Cotter (born 1943), Irish Fine Gael politician, former TD and Senator
William Cotter (pirate) (1670–1702), was a pirate who once owned the Gresham Estate in Edgewater, Maryland.

See also
William Cotter Maybury, politician from Michigan